Erik Salumäe (born 5 May 1970 in Kuressaare) is an Estonian politician. He was a member of XI Riigikogu.

See also
Politics of Estonia

References

Living people
1970 births
Estonian Reform Party politicians
Members of the Riigikogu, 2007–2011
University of Tartu alumni
People from Kuressaare